This is a list of fictional humanoid species in film. It is a collection of various notable humanoid species that are featured in film, either live-action or puppetry, but not those primarily shown via animation.

References

Film